Sir Abstrupus Danby (27 December 1655 – 27 December 1727) was an English wool merchant and country gentleman. He was the son of Christopher Danby and Anne Culpepper, niece of Lord Colepeper.

He was knighted at Kensington in 1691, and was also a justice of the peace and deputy lieutenant for Yorkshire.

In 1695, upon the death of his father, he built himself a new house at Swinton Park and sold off the family's old house of Scruton Hall. Upon his death in 1727, his properties were inherited by his son, also named Abstrupus Danby.

References
The Twickenham Museum: Sir Abstrupus Danby

1655 births
1727 deaths
English MPs 1698–1700
17th-century merchants
18th-century merchants
Abstrupus
17th-century English businesspeople
18th-century English businesspeople